Marcus Lovett is an American singer and actor who was born in Glen Ellyn, Illinois.

Career
An actor, singer and athlete from childhood, Lovett graduated from Carnegie Mellon University with honors. His classmates included the actress Ming Na Wen. Lovett then immediately joined the original Broadway production of Les Miserables. He simultaneously appeared on ABC's One Life to Live. Additional Broadway and West End roles included leads in Aspects of Love, The Phantom of the Opera, and King David, and Off-Broadway plays and musicals, including the Bruce Hornsby show, SCKBSTD. He originated the role of The Man in Whistle Down the Wind on the West End and appears on the original cast recording.

In 1994, Lovett made the front page of the New York Times by performing the lead in two Broadway shows in two days. After his final performance as the Phantom, Lovett was asked to learn the role of Billy Bigelow in Carousel as an emergency replacement for the show's ailing star; in an unusual move, Lincoln Center had temporarily closed its production. Forty-seven hours later, Lovett appeared at the Vivien Beaumont Theater as the tragic Bigelow. In 2012 Marcus reprised his role as the Phantom, this time at Her Majesty's Theatre in the West End. Michael Crawford, Peter Jöback, and Lovett are the only people to play the Phantom in London and on Broadway.

Lovett's voice is the trademark for Good Morning America, This Week with George Stephanopoulos and, for seventeen years, The David Letterman Show, in addition to thousands of commercials and promotions for television and radio. His job requires a live recording studio whenever he travels: to that end, he maintains studios in the San Francisco Bay Area, Manhattan, Los Angeles and Carmel, New York, where he maintains his primary residence. He also is the founder of the non profit organization, JoinedHands.

He was married to Leslie Motiwalla on June 18, 2022.

References

External links
 https://m.imdb.com/name/nm0522680

Year of birth missing (living people)
Living people
People from Glen Ellyn, Illinois
American male musical theatre actors
American male singers
Carnegie Mellon University alumni